The 2018 Scotties Tournament of Hearts, Canada's national women's curling championship, was held from January 27–February 4, 2018 at the South Okanagan Events Centre in Penticton, British Columbia. The winning team represented Canada at the 2018 Ford World Women's Curling Championship held from March 17–25 at the Memorial Gardens in North Bay, Ontario.

The 2018 tournament was the first to use a new 16-team format, featuring representation by all fourteen member associations of Curling Canada, the second-place team from the 2017 tournament (as champion Rachel Homan declined to participate due to her qualification for the 2018 Winter Olympics), and a new wildcard team. As part of this new format, the Bronze medal game was removed from the schedule.

Teams
Curling Canada introduced a new 16-team format for both the Tournament of Hearts and Brier for 2018, under which all 14 member associations of Curling Canada were represented in the main field, rather than being limited by a pre-qualifying tournament. The teams were divided into two pools for round robin play, after which the top four teams from each advanced to the Championship Pool. Defending champion Rachel Homan declined to participate as Team Canada in order to prepare for the 2018 Winter Olympics; Michelle Englot's team, who finished as runner-up in the 2017 tournament, participated in her place. The final spot in the tournament was filled by a wildcard play-in game held on the Friday before the tournament.

The rinks of Hollie Duncan (Ontario), Émilia Gagné (Quebec), and Casey Scheidegger (Alberta) made their Scotties debut; although members of Team Ontario had previous experience at the national women's championship, mostly as alternates. Scotties veteran skip Sherry Anderson (Saskatchewan) led a team of Tournament of Hearts rookies.

The teams are listed as follows:

CTRS ranking

Wildcard game
A wildcard play-in game was played on January 26; it was contested between the top two teams on the CTRS standings who did not win their respective provincial championships, and was played between The Glencoe Club's Chelsea Carey rink from Calgary and the East St. Paul Curling Club's Kerri Einarson rink from the Winnipeg exurb of East St. Paul. With Einarson's victory, Manitoba was represented by three different teams in the tournament.

CTRS standings for wildcard game

Wildcard Game
Friday, January 26, 18:30

Round Robin standings
Final Round Robin Standings

Round Robin results
All draw times are listed in Pacific Standard Time (UTC−8:00).

Draw 1
Saturday, January 27, 14:00

Draw 2
Saturday, January 27, 19:00

Draw 3
Sunday, January 28, 09:00

Draw 4
Sunday, January 28, 14:00

Draw 5
Sunday, January 28, 19:00

Draw 6
Monday, January 29, 09:00

Draw 7
Monday, January 29, 14:00

Draw 8
Monday, January 29, 19:00

Draw 9
Tuesday, January 30, 09:00

Draw 10
Tuesday, January 30, 14:00

Draw 11
Tuesday, January 30, 19:00

Draw 12
Wednesday, January 31, 09:00

Draw 13
Wednesday, January 31, 14:00

Draw 14
Wednesday, January 31, 19:00

Tiebreakers
Thursday, February 1, 09:00

Placement Round
Each team that finished fifth through eight in their pool played the team that finished in the same position in the opposite pool for the purpose of determining final tournament ranking. For example, the winner of the game between fifth place teams was ranked ninth place overall, the loser of that game was ranked tenth place, and so on.

Seeding Games
All game times are listed in Pacific Standard Time (UTC−8:00).

A5 vs. B5
Friday, February 02, 09:00

A6 vs. B6
Friday, February 02, 09:00

A7 vs. B7
Friday, February 02, 09:00

A8 vs. B8
Friday, February 02, 09:00

Championship Pool Standings
All wins and losses earned in the round robin (including results against teams that failed to advance) were carried forward into the Championship Pool. Wins in tiebreaker games were not carried forward.

Final Championship Pool Standings

Championship Pool Results
All draw times are listed in Pacific Standard Time (UTC−8:00).

Draw 15
Thursday, February 01, 14:00

Draw 16
Thursday, February 01, 19:00

Draw 17
Friday, February 02, 14:00

Draw 18
Friday, February 02, 19:00

Playoffs

1 vs. 2
Saturday, February 03, 19:00

3 vs. 4
Saturday, February 03, 14:00

Semifinal
Sunday, February 04, 09:00

Final
Sunday, February 04, 16:00

Statistics

Top 5 player percentages
Final Round Robin Percentages; minimum 6 games

Perfect games

Awards
The awards and all-star teams were as follows:
All-Star Teams
First Team
Skip:  Jennifer Jones, Manitoba
Third:  Cary-Anne McTaggart, Alberta
Second:  Jill Officer, Manitoba
Lead:  Dawn McEwen, Manitoba

Second Team
Skip:  Tracy Fleury, Northern Ontario
Third:  Shannon Birchard, Manitoba
Second:  Jessie Scheidegger, Alberta
Lead:  Raunora Westcott, Team Canada

Marj Mitchell Sportsmanship Award
 Sherry Anderson, Saskatchewan

Joan Mead Builder Award
 Melissa Soligo, Director of the High-Performance Program at Curl BC, national and international coach. Played second on the 1991 Scott champion Team British Columbia, earned a silver medal at the 1991 Worlds, and was a demonstration sport bronze medalist with Team Canada at the 1992 Winter Olympics in Albertville, France.

Notes

References

 
2018 in Canadian curling
Scotties Tournament of Hearts
Sport in Penticton
Curling in British Columbia
2018 in British Columbia
February 2018 sports events in Canada
January 2018 sports events in Canada
2018 in women's curling